Hestina assimilis, the red ring skirt, is a species of butterfly in the family Nymphalidae found in Asia. It is generally of large size.  There are several subspecies: H. a. assimilis, H. a. formosana (Moore, H. a. shirakii (Shirozu, 1955), and H. a. f. nigrivena (Leech)

Range 

H. assimilis is found from eastern Tibet to most all of China, in Hong Kong and in Korea.

Behavior 
H. assimilis often uses its long proboscis to probe in muddy soil or gravel to get the moisture it needs.  The male is strongly territorial, always staying in high positions to defend its territory.

References 

Apaturinae
Butterflies described in 1758
Taxa named by Carl Linnaeus
Articles containing video clips